Fulvio Tesorieri or Fulvio Thesauro (died 1616) was a Roman Catholic prelate who served as Bishop of Belcastro (1612–1616).

Biography
On 3 December 1612, Fulvio Tesorieri was appointed during the papacy of Pope Paul V as Bishop of Belcastro.
On 30 December 1612, he was consecrated bishop by Giovanni Garzia Mellini, Cardinal-Priest of Santi Quattro Coronati, with Decio Caracciolo Rosso, Archbishop of Bari-Canosa, and Giovanni Battista del Tufo, Bishop Emeritus of Acerra, serving as co-consecrators. 
He served as Bishop of Belcastro until his death in 1616.

References

External links and additional sources
 (for Chronology of Bishops) 
 (for Chronology of Bishops) 

17th-century Italian Roman Catholic bishops
Bishops appointed by Pope Paul V
1616 deaths